Mönkhbatyn Urantsetseg (born 14 March 1990) is a Mongolian sambist and retired judoka who competed in the 48 kg category, and World Champion in both sports. In 2021, she won one of the bronze medals in the women's 48 kg event at the 2020 Summer Olympics in Tokyo, Japan.

In 2013, she became the first female world champion in judo from Mongolia. At the 2012 Summer Olympics, she was defeated in the quarterfinals. At the 2016 Summer Olympics, she lost to Ami Kondo in the bronze medal match. In 2017, she is gold medalist in the Asian Judo Championship and silver medalist in the World Judo Championship. In 2019, she is bronze medalist in the World Judo Championship in Tokyo.

In 2021, she won one of the bronze medals in her event at the 2021 Judo World Masters held in Doha, Qatar and the Summer Olympics held in Tokyo, Japan. 
She is also two-time World Champion in sambo, in 2010 and 2014.

References

External links

 
 
 
 Judo Portal:World Judo Championships Rio 2013 Final -48kg MUNKHBAT (MGL)

Mongolian female judoka
Olympic judoka of Mongolia
Judoka at the 2012 Summer Olympics
Judoka at the 2016 Summer Olympics
Judoka at the 2020 Summer Olympics
Medalists at the 2020 Summer Olympics
Olympic bronze medalists for Mongolia
Olympic medalists in judo
1990 births
Living people
Asian Games medalists in judo
World judo champions
Judoka at the 2014 Asian Games
Judoka at the 2018 Asian Games
Asian Games gold medalists for Mongolia
Asian Games bronze medalists for Mongolia
Medalists at the 2014 Asian Games
Medalists at the 2018 Asian Games
Universiade medalists in judo
Universiade silver medalists for Mongolia
Universiade bronze medalists for Mongolia
Medalists at the 2009 Summer Universiade
Medalists at the 2015 Summer Universiade
People from Bayankhongor Province
20th-century Mongolian women
21st-century Mongolian women